The Flói Nature Reserve is a bird and nature reserve located near Árborg municipality in the Southern Region of Iceland. It includes a stretch of the east shore of the Ölfusá River. It is an Internationally Important Bird Area as recognised by BirdLife International. There are vistas of the surrounding mountains. The reserve establishment began in spring 1997 when Icelandic Society for the Protection of Birds was awarded funding from the Environmental Fund for Trade and its operation has received support from the Royal Society for the Protection of Birds from the UK.

Birds on the reserve
The following birds have been reported as having been seen there:
 Whooper swan
 Greylag goose
 Mallard
 Eurasian wigeon
 Common teal
 Scaup
 Tufted duck
 Red-breasted merganser
 Pintail
 Gadwall
 Northern shoveler
 Eider duck
 Red-throated diver
 Black-headed gull
 Arctic tern
 Arctic skua
 Lesser black-backed gull
 Great black-backed gull
 Meadow pipit
 Dunlin
 Whimbrel
 Black-tailed godwit
 Common snipe
 Northern wheatear
 Red-necked phalarope
 Golden plover

References

External links
Icelandic Society for the Protection of Birds

Protected areas of Iceland
Protected areas established in 1997